Pali: Manta; Mantra is a religious syllable or poem, typically from the Pali or Sanskrit languages.

Mantra or Manthra may also refer to:

Film, TV and entertainment 
 Mantra (actor), Mumbai based actor, television presenter, model, radio jockey and voice over artist
 Mantra (actress), South Indian actress
 Mantra (comics), a comic book series written by Mike Barr and published by Malibu Comics in the mid-1990s
 Mantra (2007 film), a Telugu language film
 Mantra (2016 film), a Hindi-language drama
 Mantram (film)
 Mantra Films, Inc., the film company that produces and distributes Girls Gone Wild DVD series

Music
 Mantra Recordings, a subsidiary of Beggars Banquet Records

Classical compositions
 Mantra (Stockhausen), a 1970 musical composition by the German avant garde composer Karlheinz Stockhausen
 "Mantra", a 2004 work by Romano Crivici
 Three Mantras Op.61, by John Foulds 
 Mantra, choral work by Robert Moran

Albums
 Mantra (Faakhir Mehmood album)
 Mantra (Shelter album)
 Mantra (In Vain album)

Songs
 "Mantra" (Dave Grohl song), 2013
 "Mantra" (Material song), by Bill Laswell as Material and The Orb, 1993
 "Mantra" (Bring Me the Horizon song), 2018
 "Mantra", a song by Anggun, from the  album Luminescence, 2005
 "Mantra", a song by King Crimson from the album In the Court of the Crimson King, 1969 	
 "Mantra", an instrumental by Santana from Welcome, 1973
 "Mantra", a song by Terence Blanchard from A Tale of God's Will (A Requiem for Katrina), 2007
 "Mantra", a song by Tool from their album Lateralus, 2001

Other 
 Mantra (restaurant), a Fusion cuisine restaurant in Boston
 "Mantra", a commercial software renderer for producing computer-generated imagery; part of the Houdini suite
 Mantra Group, an Australian hotel company acquired in 2017 by AccorHotels